Gagron Fort (Hindi/Rajasthani: गागरोन का किला) is a hill and water fort and is situated in Jhalawar district of Rajasthan, in the Hadoti region of India. It is an example of a hill and water fort. The fort was built by Bijaldev Singh Dod (a Rajput king) 
in the twelfth century. Later, the fort has also been controlled by Sher Shah and Akbar. The fort is constructed on the confluence of Ahu River and Kali Sindh River. The fort is surrounded by water on three sides and a moat on the forth side and hence earned the name Jaladurg (Hindi/Rajasthani: जलदुर्ग, translation: Water Fort). It was designated a UNESCO world heritage site in 2013 as a part of Hill Forts in Rajasthan.

History 
Gagron fort was constructed during the twelfth century by the king Bijaldev and the fort was ruled by the Khinchi kingdom for 300 years. The exact date on which the fort was constructed remains a mystery but historians estimate that the fort was constructed from the seventh century to the fourteenth century.

The last ruler of this fort is reported to be king Achal Das Khinchi. During the medieval power, there muslim rulers of Malwa attacked Gagron fort. Sultan Hoshang Shah attacked the fort in the year 1423 with an army that included 30 thousand horsemen and 84 elephant riders. Achal Das Khinchi, on realizing that his defeat was inevitable, due to the Sultan's superior numbers and higher grade weapons, did not surrender and fought till he lost his life, which is accordance to Rajput tradition. Furthermore, many women performed jauhar (burnt themselves alive), in order to avoid being taken captive by the Sultan's forces. The fort has reportedly seen 14 battles and 2 jauhars of queens.

The fort has also been conquered by Sher Shah and Akbar. Akbar also reportedly made this fort a headquarter and later gave it to Prathviraj of Bikaner as a part of his estate.

Structures 

Gagron Fort is surrounded by water on three sides and a moat filled with water on the fourth side. It is constructed on the confluence of Ahu River and Kali Sindh River. The fort also boasts three ramparts as opposed to traditional forts that have only two. The towers of the fort are blended with Mukundara Hills of the Vindhya Range. The mountain that the fort sits on is itself the foundation of the fort. The fort also has two main entrances. One gate leads towards the river, while the other gate leads towards the hilly road.

The following are some important sites of the fort:

 Ganesh Pol
 Nakkarkhana
 Bhairavi Pol
 Kishan Pole
 Selekhana
 Dewan-i-Aam
 Diwan-e-Khas
 Janaana Mahal
 Madhusudan Mandir
 Rang Mahal
The fort is the only fort in North India surrounded by water and has been named the Jaladurga (Water Fort) of India. A mausoleum of Sufi Saint Mitthe Shah just outside the fort is the venue for an annual colourful fair held during the month of Muharram. There is also a monastery of Saint Pipaji across the confluence.

Conservation
Six Hill forts of Rajasthan, namely, Amer Fort, Chittor Fort, Gagron Fort, Jaisalmer Fort, Kumbhalgarh and Ranthambore Fort were included in the UNESCO World Heritage Site list during the 37th meeting of the World Heritage Committee in Phnom Penh during June 2013. They were recognized as a serial cultural property and examples of Rajput military hill architecture.

References

External links

Tourist attractions in Jhalawar district
Forts in Rajasthan
World Heritage Sites in India